Calliotropis reticulina is a species of sea snail, a marine gastropod mollusk in the family Eucyclidae.

Description

The shell can grow to be 7 mm in length.

Distribution
It can be found off of the coast of Hawaii.

References

 Vilvens C. (2007) New records and new species of Calliotropis from Indo-Pacific. Novapex 8 (Hors Série 5): 1–72.

External links

reticulina
Gastropods described in 1895